Arctia opulenta is a moth of the family Erebidae. It was described by Henry Edwards in 1881. It is found from Alaska through northern British Columbia to Labrador. The habitat consists of arctic tundra and alpine and subalpine tundra.

The length of the forewings is about 25 mm. The forewings are white with dark brown grey markings. The hindwings are red with a black discal spot and a series of round black spots filled with metallic blue scales.

The larvae feed on Salix species.

References

 , 1923: New American Lepidoptera. Insecutor Inscitiae Menstruus 11 (1-3): 12–30.
 , 1881: Descriptions of new species and varieties of Arctiidæ. Papilio 1 (3): 38–39.
 , 1910: Catalogue of the Arctianae in the Tring museum, with notes and descriptions of new species. Novitates Zoologicae 17 (1): 1-85, (2): 113–188, pl. XI-XIV, 18: pl. III-VI, London and Aylesbury.

Moths described in 1881
Arctiina
Moths of North America
Insects of the Arctic